Ronald Te Huia Cribb (born 7 July 1976) is a former New Zealand rugby union player. A loose forward, the 1.94 m, 110 kg Cribb is a former All Black, and mainly played number eight.

Early life 
Cribb was born in Whanganui, but was raised in Taihape. His mother left when he was 3.5 years old, and has been troubled by alcohol-related violence. His father, James, died in May, 2011. He befriended Troy Flavell and looked to his family as parental figures. He was expelled from Rutherford High School due to anger issues.

Career 
Cribb last played professionally in Japan for Kobelco Steelers. He joined from the North Harbour province.

During his time with North Harbour, Cribb played alongside fellow former All Black Troy Flavell, who was also Cribb's teammate in the Massey High School 1st XV and for the Massey Premier side. Both got their first All Blacks call-ups on the same day.

Cribb played 16 games for the All Blacks, 34 Super 12 games for the Auckland Blues and 41 games for North Harbour. He also played 6 games for New Zealand Māori.

In 2010, his career ended when he suffered a broken neck in Japan as a result of a collapsed maul. In 2020, he was in the Match Fit squad with fellow alumni against New Zealand Barbarians, but was ruled out of the match as the prolapsed cervical disc neck injury had not fully healed.

He returned to Match Fit for season 2 in 2021/22 (aired in June 2022), but revealed that his starting weight and total cholesterol levels were higher than the beginning of season 2, as he was recovering from torn Achilles when playing touch rugby, and also just recovered from non-COVID-19 bronchitis. He remained as a touch-rugby-only reserve player, and emergency assistant coach when Graham Henry was unwell due to illness in season 2.

Cribb is a castaway on the 2022 series of the New Zealand reality television show Celebrity Treasure Island.

References

External links 

1976 births
Living people
Māori All Blacks players
New Zealand international rugby union players
New Zealand rugby union players
Rugby union number eights
Kobelco Kobe Steelers players
Expatriate rugby union players in Japan
North Harbour rugby union players
Crusaders (rugby union) players
Blues (Super Rugby) players
People educated at Massey High School
Expatriate rugby union players in Italy
New Zealand expatriate rugby union players
New Zealand expatriate sportspeople in Italy
New Zealand expatriate sportspeople in Japan
Rugby union players from Whanganui
Participants in New Zealand reality television series